Diana Wenman is an American television director and editor.

Positions held
 Director on All My Children (1981), and Search for Tomorrow.
 Associate Director on Royal Society Jazz Orchestra (1986)
 Editor on The Electric Company
 Producer's Assistant on Mack and Myer for Hire
 Television Stage Manager on Manon Lescaut

Awards and nominations
Wenman has been nominated for three Daytime Emmy awards in the category Outstanding Achievement in Technical Excellence for a Daytime Drama Series, for her work on All My Children. She was nominated in 1980, 1981, and 1982, and won all three awards. Her first win was shared with Joseph Solomito, Howard Zweig, Lawrence Hammond, Robert Ambrico, Diane Cates-Cantrell, Christopher Mauro, Larry Strack, Vincent Senatore, Albin S. Lemanski, Len Walas, Jean Dadario-Burke, Roger Haenelt, John Grella, Irving Robbin, James Reichert, and Teri Smith.

External links
 

Place of birth missing (living people)
Year of birth missing (living people)
Living people
American television directors
Emmy Award winners
American women television directors
American television editors
Women television editors